Samantha Diaz (born November 23, 1998), known by their stage name Just Sam, is a singer-songwriter from Harlem, New York who rose to fame after winning the eighteenth season of the singing reality show American Idol.

Early life
Just Sam was born and raised in Harlem, New York. When they were six years old, their grandmother, Elizabeth, adopted Diaz and their sister, Anabelle, after their mother had been incarcerated. They were the topic of a short documentary in 2018 called Sam, Underground, which was shot and produced by Joe Penney and Ladan Osman. In the documentary, they explained that in high school, they were bullied for how they dressed, inspiring their "Just Sam" nickname.

Prior to appearing on American Idol, Just Sam made a living singing in subway trains, and auditioned for America's Got Talent and the American iteration of The Voice, but neither one came to fruition.

American Idol
Just Sam auditioned for the eighteenth season of the singing reality show American Idol in Washington, D.C. on October 14, 2019. After surviving Hollywood Week and making it into the Top 5, Just Sam received the most votes to win, and on May 17, 2020, Just Sam was crowned the winner of the eighteenth season of American Idol, beating runner-up Arthur Gunn. Just Sam was also the first African American winner since Candice Glover in season twelve and the show's revival on ABC.

Post-Idol 
After winning American Idol in May 2020, Just Sam signed with Hollywood Records, although this arrangement was short-lived. Just Sam left the label without releasing any albums under them, explaining in 2022, "I thought it was gonna be easy. Just go to the studio, record, put out music, and that's not how the world works. That's not how the industry works. It takes time, it takes money that I don't have. It takes patience." Just Sam had to pay Hollywood Records to claim the music they recorded with the label, stating that they "ended up broke" in the process, but that they planned to release music "when I can and when it's ready."

On March 13, 2021, Just Sam released "Africando," their first single since American Idol, which they wrote with a co-songwriter named Cat Clark and released with the help of independent digital music service DistroKid.

On September 28, 2021, Just Sam released a second independent single called "Change," which they wrote and recorded with Cat Clark. Just Sam dedicated the song to family members and friends who were murder victims.

Personal life 
In a May 19, 2020 interview with Chuck Arnold of the New York Post, Just Sam stated, "I am a child of God, so that's always gonna come first. That's actually the only label that I ever want to have. But I like what I like, and that's just that, you know? And it's not men. Like, at all."

On August 24, 2022, Just Sam was admitted to the hospital for an undisclosed illness. Diaz's weight dropped to 100 pounds. On August 26, Diaz posted an update confirming, "I'm doing much better now."

Just Sam goes by singular 'they' pronouns.

Discography

Singles 

|-
|2022
|"Pain is Power"
|Non-album single (released by Samantha Diaz through Just Sam Entertainment)
|}
|-
|2022
|"Question"
|Non-album single (released by Samantha Diaz through Just Sam Entertainment)
|}

Notes

References 

1998 births
21st-century American women singers
American Idol participants
American Idol winners
African-American women singer-songwriters
Living people
Hollywood Records artists
American LGBT singers
LGBT people from New York (state)
21st-century American singers